Jinpu is a town in southeastern Henan province, China. It is under the administration of Yucheng County.

References 

Township-level divisions of Henan